Blessed is a 2009 Australian drama film directed by Ana Kokkinos and starring Miranda Otto and Frances O'Connor. It was released in Australia on 10 September 2009. It is a film adaptation of the play Who's Afraid of the Working Class?

The film was written by Andrew Bovell, Patricia Cornelius, Melissa Reeves and Christos Tsiolkas, as was the play. The film is 113 minutes in length and was filmed in Melbourne.

Premise 
The film is centered upon the interweaving lives and misadventures of six lost kids who wander the Melbourne streets at night while their mothers await their return home.

Cast 
 Frances O'Connor as Rhonda
 Miranda Otto as Bianca
 Deborra-Lee Furness as Tanya
 Victoria Haralabidou as Gina
 Monica Maughan as Laurel Parker
 Wayne Blair as James Parker
 William McInnes as Peter
 Tasma Walton as Gail
 Sophie Lowe as Katrina
 Anastasia Baboussouras as Trisha
 Harrison Gilbertson as Daniel
 Eamon Farren as Roo
 Eva Lazzaro as Stacey
 Reef Ireland as Orton

See also
 Cinema of Australia

References

External links 
 

2009 films
2009 drama films
Films shot in Melbourne
Films based on works by Australian writers
Films scored by Cezary Skubiszewski
Australian drama films
2000s English-language films
2000s Australian films